The men's 1000 metres competition at the 2020 European Speed Skating Championships was held on 12 January 2020.

Results
The race was started at 16:05.

References

Men's 1000 metres